Center Theatre, also known as the Woodbourne Theater, is a historic theatre located at Woodbourne in Sullivan County, New York.  It was built in 1938 and is a three bays wide, two stories tall Art Deco structure.  It is three time longer than it is wide and has a large auditorium behind the entrance pavilion.  The entrance pavilion consists of the facade, foyer, and lobby.

It was added to the National Register of Historic Places in 2001.

References

External links
Recent Photos of the Center Theatre by Matt Lambros

Theatres on the National Register of Historic Places in New York (state)
Theatres completed in 1938
Art Deco architecture in New York (state)
Buildings and structures in Sullivan County, New York
National Register of Historic Places in Sullivan County, New York